Savita Prabhune is an Indian show opera actress best known for her role of Aai in Ekta Kapoor's Indian soap opera Kkusum and as Sulochana Karanjkar in Ekta Kapoor's Indian soap opera Pavitra Rishta. She had also played the main role in Jawai Vikat Ghene Aahe and Khulta Kali Khulena.

She has also replaced Asawari Joshi as Gayatri in the Marathi TV Serial Mala Sasu Havi. Recently she replaced actress Madhavi Gogate in Hindi TV Serial  Anupamaa as Kanta Joshi, Anupamaa's mother and actress Surekha Kudachi in Marathi TV Serial Swabhiman - Shodh Astitvacha as Suparna Purushottam Suryavanshi.

Career
Her father was a doctor at Wai, their native place in the district, Satara. Savita started her career by portraying small roles in Marathi film and Hindi film industry in the early 1990s.

She is an alumnus of National School of Drama passing out in 1983. She started her television career in the mid-1990s. Her biggest break came when she was approached by Ekta Kapoor to play the supporting actor in her soap opera Kkusum, where she played the role of Aai (Kusum's Mother). The role fetched her critical acclaim for her portrayal.

In 2009, Savita was again approached by Ekta Kapoor to play the role of Sulochana Karanjkar, the mother of protagonist Archana in her indian soap opera Pavitra Rishta on Zee TV. The role fetched her critical acclaim and major awards. She went on to win the Indian Telly Award for Best Actress in a Supporting Role, Boroplus Gold Award for Best Actress in Supporting Role (Critics) (Twice) and other major awards.

Television

Filmography
 1984 - Party
 1985 - Lek Chalali Sasarla
 1986 - Dhakti Sun 
 1987 - Khara kadhi bolu naye
 1987 - Chhakke Panje as Usha
 1989 - Kalat Nakalat 
1989 - Fekafeki  
 1992 - Current as Radha a neighbour 
 1993 - Lapandav (1993 Film) as Ulka A. Mahasabdey 
 1998 - Do Numbri as Urmila Devi 
 2000 - Fiza as policewoman
 2002 - Fihaal
 2003 - Tere Naam as Radhe's sister-in-law
 2004 - 7G Rainbow Colony (Tamil / Telugu film) as Anita's mother
 2014 - Killa as Mrs. Nivte 
 2015 - Highway 
 2015 - Mumbai-Pune-Mumbai 2 as Sunanda Deshpande
 2017 -  TTMM – Tujha Tu Majha Mi 
 2018 - Mumbai-Pune-Mumbai 3 as Sunanda Deshpande
 2019 - Bandishala

Awards

References

External links
 
 

Living people
Indian film actresses
Actresses in Hindi cinema
Indian soap opera actresses
Actresses from Mumbai
Actresses in Hindi television
Indian television actresses
21st-century Indian actresses
20th-century Indian actresses
Actors from Mumbai
1964 births